"We Can Do It" was a single released by the English football team Liverpool in 1977, sung to the same tune as The Rubettes' 1975 hit "I Can Do It".  It reached number 15 in the UK Singles Chart.

References

1977 singles
Liverpool F.C. songs
Football songs and chants
1977 songs
Song articles with missing songwriters